Hay Island may refer to:

 Hay Island (Queensland), Australia
 Hay Island (Tasmania), Australia
 Hay Island (Georgian Bay), Ontario, Canada
 Hay Islands, Nunavut, Canada
 Hay Island, County Fermanagh, a townland in County Fermanagh, Northern Ireland
 Hay Island (Connecticut), United States